Jan Britstra (10 April 1905 – 7 March 1987) was a Dutch hurdler. He competed in the men's 110 metres hurdles at the 1928 Summer Olympics.

References

External links
 

1905 births
1987 deaths
Athletes (track and field) at the 1928 Summer Olympics
Dutch male hurdlers
Olympic athletes of the Netherlands
People from Noordenveld
Sportspeople from Drenthe